Elk Ridge (population: 128) is a resort village in the District of Lakeland No. 521, Saskatchewan, Canada.

History 
Elk Ridge was established as an organized hamlet on January 31, 2016. On June 10, 2021, an order was approved to incorporate Elk Ridge as a resort village effective January 1, 2022.

Demographics 
According to Statistics Canada, Elk Ridge had a population of 128 in 2021.

A municipal census conducted in 2019 counted 112 permanent residents, 371 seasonal residents, and 203 temporary residents.

Government 
The election of the first council for the Resort Village of Elk Ridge will occur on September 4, 2021.

References 

Lakeland No. 521, Saskatchewan
Resort villages in Saskatchewan
Division No. 15, Saskatchewan